The Codex Marianus is an Old Church Slavonic fourfold Gospel Book written in Glagolitic script, dated to the beginning of the 11th century, which is (along with Codex Zographensis), one of the oldest manuscript witnesses to the Old Church Slavonic language, one of the two fourfold gospels being part of the Old Church Slavonic canon.

History
Most of the Codex (172 folios, 171 according to some sources) was discovered by Victor Grigorovich at Mount Athos during a journey to the Balkans in 1844-45, in a hermitage belonging to the "Monastery of the Holy Mother of God" (the Blessed Theotokos), and thus the manuscript was named Codex Marianus in Latin. Grigorovich took the found folios to Kazan', and after his death in 1876 the Codex was transferred to Russian State Library in Moscow where it carries the catalog number грнг 6 (M.1689). Croatian diplomat and amateur scholar Antun Mihanović acquired 2 folios (containing Matthew 5.23 - 6.16) some time before Grigorovich made his discovery, and sent it to renowned Slovene Slavist Franz Miklosich, who had them published in 1850. After Miklosich's death, the two-folio fragment was deposited in the Austrian National Library in Vienna under the catalogue number Cod. Slav. 146.

The Codex was first published by Croatian Slavist Vatroslav Jagić in 1883 in Berlin as Quattuor Evangeliorum versionis palaeoslovenicae Codex Marianus Glagoliticus, transcribed in Cyrillic script and with extensive philological commentary in Latin. The reprint was published in Graz in 1960.

Linguistic analysis and origin
Text of Codex especially abounds with the usage of asigmatic aorist, and very frequent is the assimilation of vowels in compound adjectival declension and present forms (-aago, -uumu instead of -aego, -uemu; -aatъ instead of -aetъ etc.).

Analysing the language of the Codex, Vatroslav Jagić concluded that one of the scribes of the Codex came from the Eastern-rite Štokavian area (see Serbian recension), on the basis of substitutions u - ǫ, i - y, u - vъ, e - ę etc. The conclusion about Serbian origin of the Codex has been disputed by Russian slavist Alexander Budilovich who believed that the Codex was written in northern Albania, in northern Macedonia or Mount Athos, in Bulgarian language environment. At the same time the Bulgarian researcher Lyubomir Miletich analysing some dialectal characteristics, claimed Western Bulgarian origin (from Macedonia) of the Codex.

Later researchers as Josip Hamm has warned that vocalization of yers (ъ > o, ь > e), as well as the occasional disappearance of epenthetic l, suggests Macedonian provenience. According to F. Curta, the book was "certainly of Macedonian origin", written "either in Ohrid or in one of the monastic centers in the region." According to H. G. Lunt, "Certain deviations from the theoretical norms indicate Macedonian influences, others possibly Serbian (if not northern Macedonian)". There are a number of arguments that link the Codex Marianus with Bulgarian territory that bordered that of Serbia.  It is difficult to answer whether the Codex was created before the end of the First Bulgarian Empire (1018), or after its Byzantine conquest, i.e. into the theme of Bulgaria. Lunt proposed the 1030s, but David Diringer dates it from the late 10th century.

Legacy
The book is enumerated in Bulgarian and Serbian historical literary corpus.

Codex forms the base text for the contemporary rendition of the New Testament on the basis of the Slavic recensions in the series Novum Testamentum Palaeoslovenice.

See also

 List of Glagolitic manuscripts

Notes

References

External links
 Codex Marianus: images of the original manuscript, at Collected Manuscripts and Incunabula
 Codex Marianus transliterated in 7-bit ASCII, at the Corpus Cyrillo-Methodianum Helsingiense
 Codex Marianus, at TITUS project

Further reading
  (archive.org, Google Books US)
 B. M. Metzger, The Early Versions of the New Testament, (Oxford:  Oxford University Press, 1977), 405-406.
 Evangelium secundum Ioannem, Novum Testamentum Palaeoslovenice 1 (St. Petersburg, 1998).
 M. Garzaniti, Die altslavische Version der Evangelien, (Köln:  Böhlau, 2001).
 Ђ. Трифуновић, Ка почецима српске писмености, Београд 2001

1030s books
Church Slavonic manuscripts
Marianus
Marianus, Codex
Medieval Bulgarian literature of Macedonia
11th-century biblical manuscripts
Marianus
National Library of Russia collection
Serbian manuscripts
History of the Serbo-Croatian language
Cyrillo-Methodian studies